Gleek may refer to:

 Gleeking, a type of spitting that usually occurs while yawning 
 Gleek (card game), a 16th-century game similar to post and pair
 Gleek (Super Friends), Wonder Twins' pet space monkey in the animated series Super Friends
 A fan of Glee (TV series)